This is a complete list of Estonian generals in the Estonian Defence Forces, past and present. The list includes senior officers who held the rank of general, lieutenant general, major general and brigadier general in the Estonian Land Forces or the Estonian Air Force and the rank of admiral, vice admiral, rear admiral and commodore in the Estonian Navy.

List of generals

See also
 Military of Estonia
 List of Estonian commanders
 List of former Estonian commanders

References

Estonian military leaders
Estonian generals